Saltillo is an unincorporated community in Perry County, in the U.S. state of Ohio.

History

References

Unincorporated communities in Perry County, Ohio
Unincorporated communities in Ohio
1849 establishments in Ohio